is a Japanese professional futsal club, currently playing in the F. League Division 1. The team is located in Sumida, Tokyo, Japan. Their main ground is Sumida City Gymnasium.

History

Trophies 
All Japan Futsal Championship:
Winners: 2009

Sources
  
 F. League team page 

Futsal clubs in Japan
Sports teams in Tokyo
Futsal clubs established in 2001
2001 establishments in Japan